Dragan Mladenović (born 29 March 1956) is a Serbian former handball player who competed for Yugoslavia in the 1984 Summer Olympics.

Club career
Born in Pirot, Mladenović spent most of his career at Železničar Niš, winning two Yugoslav Cups (1981–82 and 1984–85). He also played abroad in Spain, spending two seasons with Teka Cantabria (1986–1988).

International career
At international level, Mladenović competed for Yugoslavia at the 1984 Summer Olympics, winning the gold medal. He was also a member of the team that won the 1986 World Championship.

Honours
Železničar Niš
 Yugoslav Handball Cup: 1981–82, 1984–85

References

External links
 Olympic record
 

1956 births
Living people
People from Pirot
Serbian male handball players
Yugoslav male handball players
Olympic handball players of Yugoslavia
Olympic gold medalists for Yugoslavia
Handball players at the 1984 Summer Olympics
Olympic medalists in handball
Medalists at the 1984 Summer Olympics
Competitors at the 1983 Mediterranean Games
Mediterranean Games gold medalists for Yugoslavia
Mediterranean Games medalists in handball
CB Cantabria players
Liga ASOBAL players
Expatriate handball players
Yugoslav expatriate sportspeople in Spain